Pino Donati (9 May 1907 – 24 February 1975) was an Italian composer and for many years artistic director of the Chicago Lyric Opera.

Donati was born in Verona.  From 1936 he was superintendent of the Arena di Verona and then from 1950 the Teatro Comunale of Bologna. In 1958 he left Italy for Chicago to work for Carol Fox and remained employed there till his death in Rome at the age of 67.  His wife, who survived him, was the soprano Maria Caniglia.

Works, editions, recordings
 theatre music for the play Fiorenza by Sem Benelli
 chamber music – Pastorale della trincea 1933
Hungaria for choir and orchestra
Operas
Corradino lo svevo on the life of Conradin the Swabian, to a libretto by the Veronese writer Arturo Rossato (1882–1942) – premiere Verona 1931.
Lancillotto del Lago premiere Bergamo 1938

References

Italian classical composers
Italian male classical composers
Musicians from Verona
Opera managers
1907 births
1975 deaths
20th-century classical composers
20th-century Italian composers
Italian opera composers
Male opera composers
20th-century Italian male musicians